Fenton Brian Keogh (born 21 December 1971) is an Australian celebrity chef and winner of LifeStyle Food's Great BBQ Challenge in January 2007. He and his wife Lisa are the owners of Fentons at the Ipswich Club, located in Ipswich, Queensland & his son Jacob helps run the restaurant. 

His signature dish, Aussie Pav with Boozy Summer Fruits, was featured on the Australia Day special on the Today Show 26.01.07 (Nine Network). Though not prepared the traditional way in an oven, the pavlova was all done on the BBQ in 10 minutes. It was shot totally live alongside Channel 9 personality Scott Cam.

References

Australian chefs
Australian television presenters
1971 births
Living people